Dr. MK Ranjitsinh Jhala (born 19 February 1939) is an author and authority on wildlife and nature conservation from India.

He served also as Chairman of the Wildlife Trust of India (WTI); Dir-Gen CAPART; Dir. and Regional Co-ordinator WWF Tiger Conservation Programme (TCP). Regional Adviser in Nature Conservation (Asia & Pacific) for UNEP. Trustee The Corbett Foundation,  member National Forest Commission, Indian Institute of Forest Management Society, International Tropical Timber Organization, Madhya Pradesh State Wildlife Board until 2006

He joined Indian Administrative Services in 1961 and served in various important posts like Secretary for Forests & Tourism in Madha Pradesh 1970-1973, Director Wildlife Preservation 1973-1975.  He is author of several books on Indian wildlife and conservation like - "The Indian Blackbuck" (1989), "Indian Wildlife" (1995), "Beyond the Tiger: Portraits of Asian Wildlife" (1997) and others

His most noted works are drafting of Wildlife (Protection) Act, 1972 of India and demarcating many forest as wildlife sanctuaries. Further, reintroduction of the cheetah in India as a policy was implemented upon  advisory papers submitted by MK Ranjitsinh Jhala and Divyabhanusinh Chavda. They presented their papers after through research on how to go about bringing cheetahs back to India.

He was awarded lifetime achievement award in 2014 for his works in conservation of wildlife.

Notes

References

1939 births
Indian conservationists
Indian Administrative Service officers
Gujarati people
People from Rajkot district
Living people
Indian royalty